Filippo Caffieri (1634–1716), known as Philippe Caffieri, was an Italian decorative sculptor, active mainly in France.

He was born in Rome to an aristocratic family originally from Naples. After briefly serving Pope Alexander VII, was brought to France by Cardinal Mazarin and entered the service of Louis XIV in 1660. He installed him in the same building as the Gobelins Manufactory, engaged in decorative, design, and engineering work for the French crown. He married the sister of the king's painter, Charles Le Brun. He was the first in a family of sculptors, his sons and descendants would form the prolific Caffieri family of sculptors active mainly for the French court.

Children
François-Charles Philippe Caffieri (Francesco Carlo Caffieri) (1667–1721), eldest son, associated with his father's work and sculptor for ships
Jacques, fifth son with disability

Sources

1634 births
1716 deaths
17th-century French sculptors
French male sculptors
18th-century French sculptors
17th-century Italian sculptors
Italian male sculptors
18th-century Italian sculptors
Italian emigrants to France
18th-century French male artists
18th-century Italian male artists